The 49th Grey Cup was the Canadian Football League's championship game of the 1961 season on December 2, 1961. The Winnipeg Blue Bombers defeated the Hamilton Tiger-Cats 21–14 at CNE Stadium in Toronto before 32,651 fans.  It is considered to be one of the 10 greatest Grey Cup Games of all time.

Game summary

The score was tied 14–14 at the end of regulation time. The only score in overtime came when Winnipeg quarterback Ken Ploen called his own number and tiptoed down the sideline for the touchdown.

Trivia

This was the first Grey Cup and only one of four games to go into overtime, the others being the 2005 Grey Cup, the 2016 Grey Cup and the 2021 Grey Cup.

Ingrid Osmolowsky, Miss Hamilton Tiger Cat, was crowned Miss Grey Cup 1961

References

Grey Cup
Grey Cup
Grey Cups hosted in Toronto
Hamilton Tiger-Cats
Winnipeg Blue Bombers
1961 in Toronto
1961 in Canadian television
December 1961 sports events in Canada